Zemla, Žemla or Żemła may refer to
Zemla Intifada (Zemla Uprising), disturbances in 1970 in the Zemla district in Sahara
Anna Żemła-Krajewska (born 1979), Polish judoka
Ladislav Žemla (1887–1955), Czech tennis player

See also
 
Zemlya (disambiguation)